The following is a list of timeline articles:

Prehistory
For events dating from the formation of the universe see: Timeline of the early universe and Timeline of the universe
For events dating from the formation of the planet to the rise of modern humans see: Timeline of natural history, Timeline of the evolutionary history of life, Timeline of life and Timeline of human development
For events dating from the first appearance of Homo sapiens to before the invention of writing see: Timeline of prehistory

History
These timelines of world history detail recorded events since the creation of writing roughly 5000 years ago to the present day.

For events from  see: Timeline of ancient history

Future
For future timelines, see: Timelines of the future

See also
 ChronoZoom
 Human history
 List of years
 List of decades, centuries, and millennia